Daetaleus is a genus of bristle flies in the family Tachinidae. There are at least two described species in Daetaleus.

Species
Daetaleus azurea (Curran, 1934)
Daetaleus purpureus Aldrich, 1928

References

Dexiinae
Tachinidae genera
Diptera of South America
Taxa named by John Merton Aldrich